Fox Crossing is a village in Winnebago County, Wisconsin, United States. It was incorporated from the former Town of Menasha in 2016. The population as of the 2020 census was 18,974.

Fox Crossing is located in the Fox Cities region and the Appleton-Oshkosh-Neenah, WI CSA, the third largest metropolitan area in Wisconsin.

History
The Town of Menasha was organized on April 3, 1855, in part from land formerly belonging to the Town of Neenah. The original land area of the town was reduced over several decades due to annexations from the cities of Menasha and Appleton.

After town residents west of Little Lake Butte des Morts approved a referendum to incorporate, the Village was incorporated on April 20, 2016. On August 17, 2016, an agreement was reached between the Village of Fox Crossing and the remaining Town of Menasha to annex all remaining town lands to Fox Crossing. This agreement effectively ended the existence of the Town of Menasha. On September 22, 2016, the remaining parts of the town of Menasha became part of the Village of Fox Crossing. Officials from Fox Crossing reportedly told officials from nearby municipalities that the sole motivation for incorporation was to avoid being annexed by a larger community.

A prominent feature of the village's early history was border struggles; Fox Crossing was sued by the town of Clayton and town of Neenah over separate disputes. Clayton sued Fox Crossing in December 2017 over a 72-acre annexation the previous September, and Fox Crossing sued Clayton in 2018 over a wastewater collection settlement with the Department of Natural Resources. Clayton had previously rebuffed attempts by Fox Crossing to annex three more high-value acres of land in exchange for wastewater service. In 2020, the town and village agreed to a wastewater collection plan. Clayton paid Fox Crossing a one-time sum of $11.5 million and Fox Crossing agreed to a decade of inaction annexing land in Clayton. In June 2020, Fox Crossing annexed over a hundred acres of land from the town of Neenah at the site of a future Neenah High School. It was later revealed that Fox Crossing and Neenah had a border agreement in place from 2016 through 2019; the town blamed Fox Crossing for failing to find a long-term border solution.

Geography
Fox Crossing is located at the north end of Lake Winnebago along the Fox River which forms Little Lake Butte des Morts through the Village. The Village partially surrounds the City of Menasha. Other adjacent communities include: Harrison to the east, the City of Neenah and Town of Neenah to the south, Clayton to the west, and the Outagamie County communities of Greenville and Grand Chute to the north and Appleton to the northeast.

Demographics

Education
Public education is provided by the Neenah Joint School District, west of Little Lake Butte des Morts, and the Menasha Joint School District, east of the lake.

St. Mary Catholic High School and St. Mary Catholic Middle School are located in Fox Crossing.

Points of Interest
Fox River
Friendship State Trail
Lake Winnebago
Little Lake Butte des Morts
Tri-County Arena

Transportation
Major transportation routes in Fox Crossing include:

Appleton International Airport is located adjacent to Fox Crossing in Greenville. Valley Transit provides bus services.

References

External links

Villages in Winnebago County, Wisconsin
Villages in Wisconsin
Appleton–Fox Cities metropolitan area
2016 establishments in Wisconsin